H52 or H-52 may refer to :
 H-52 (Michigan county highway)
 Bernard H.52, a French floatplane
 , a Royal Navy H-class submarine
 Sikorsky HH-52 Seaguard, an American helicopter